Logan Miles Woodside (born January 27, 1995) is an American football quarterback for the Atlanta Falcons of the National Football League (NFL). He played college football at Toledo. He was drafted by the Cincinnati Bengals in the 2018 NFL Draft. He was also previously a member of the Tennessee Titans and San Antonio Commanders of the Alliance of American Football (AAF).

College career

2014 season 
After Alabama transfer Phillip Ely was injured, Woodside made 11 starts during the 2014 season. On September 12, 2014, he recorded 322 yards and three touchdowns in his season debut against Cincinnati. The next two weeks he ran in three touchdowns and threw another three against Ball State and Central Michigan. On October 25, Woodside recorded 225 yards and three touchdowns against UMass and did the same with 202 yards the next week against Kent State. On November 28, Woodside recorded a career-high five touchdowns against Eastern Michigan and Toledo ending the season as co-MAC West champs. He ranked fourth in passing efficiency and completion percentage in the MAC, leading the Rockets to a win over Arkansas State in the GoDaddy Bowl.

2016 season 
Woodside redshirted the 2015 season in favor of Ely. In the battle for the starter job for the 2016 season he competed against Michael Julian and Mitch Guadagni and earned the job. On September 2, 2016, Woodside recorded 371 yards and three touchdowns in the season-opener against Arkansas State. On September 10, he threw four touchdowns against Maine and another four against Fresno State the next week. On October 1, Woodside recorded a school-record 505 yards and five touchdowns against BYU. He was named MAC West Division Player and Male Scholar Athlete of the Week for his performance. On October 8, he recorded four touchdowns against Eastern Michigan and did the same against Central Michigan two weeks later. On November 9, Woodside scored three touchdowns in the 28-point comeback win against Northern Illinois, outscoring the Huskies 28–10 in the second half. In the 2016 Camellia Bowl, he recorded 247 yards and two touchdowns in the 28–31 loss. At the end of the season he recorded 4,129 yards and 45 touchdowns with 8 interceptions. He was named First-team All-MAC.

2017 season 
On August 31, 2017, Woodside threw for 314 yards in the season opening win against Elon. On September 16, he tied a school record, throwing six touchdowns in a 54–51 comeback win against Tulsa. The Rockets outscored Tulsa 44–23 after being down 21 points. He was named MAC West Division Offensive Player of the Week for his performance. The next week, Woodside threw for 342 yards and three touchdowns against #14 Miami. On October 21, he threw five touchdowns and 304 yards against Akron. On November 2, Woodside threw for 361 yards against Northern Illinois, becoming Toledo's career passing leader, breaking Bruce Gradkowski's record of 9,225 yards set from 2002–05. On November 24, he recorded 300 yards and two touchdowns in a 37–10 win over Western Michigan, claiming the West Division crown. In the Mid-American Conference Championship game against Akron, Woodside recorded 307 yards and four touchdowns in a 45–28 win. At the end of the regular season he had thrown for a total of 3,451 yards and 23 touchdowns. His career total 10,083 yards set a new school record and was the first time in school history that the 10,000-yard mark was broken. Woodside was named First-team All-MAC, MAC Offensive Player of the Year, and received the Vern Smith Leadership Award. Woodside led the team to a 10–2 record, giving the Toledo Rockets their first participation in the MAC Football Championship since 2004.

College statistics

Professional career

Cincinnati Bengals
Woodside was drafted by the Cincinnati Bengals in the seventh round with the 249th overall pick in the 2018 NFL Draft. He signed his rookie contract on May 11, 2018. He was waived on September 1, 2018.

Tennessee Titans
On September 3, 2018, Woodside was signed to the Tennessee Titans' practice squad. He was released on September 25, 2018.

San Antonio Commanders
On November 27, 2018, Woodside was drafted by the San Antonio Commanders in third round of the 2019 AAF QB Draft.

In Week 5 of the 2019 AAF season against the Arizona Hotshots, Woodside completed 21 of 27 passes for 290 yards, two touchdowns, one interception, and a 120.7 passer rating en route to a San Antonio 29–25 win. During the first half, he had completed all but one throw for 192 yards and two touchdowns with a perfect 158.3 rating. He was eventually named AAF Offensive Player of the Week.

Tennessee Titans (second stint)

After the AAF suspended football operations, Woodside re-signed with the Tennessee Titans on April 8, 2019. He was waived on August 31, 2019 and was signed to the practice squad the next day. He signed a reserve/future contract with the Titans on January 20, 2020.

On March 9, 2022, the Titans re-signed Woodside to a one-year deal.

On August 30, 2022, Woodside was waived by the Titans and signed to the practice squad the next day.

Atlanta Falcons
On December 12, 2022, Woodside was signed by the Atlanta Falcons off the Titans practice squad.

Career statistics

Personal life
Jason Woodside, Logan's father, played safety for Eastern Kentucky University from 1992 to 1995.

Woodside was arrested for speeding and DUI on June 9, 2018 in Bellevue, Kentucky. He was booked by police at 3:46 AM and blew a .112 blood-alcohol content. He was speeding in a parking lot shortly before the time of his arrest.

References

External links
Atlanta Falcons bio
Toledo Rockets bio

1995 births
Living people
People from Frankfort, Kentucky
Players of American football from Kentucky
American football quarterbacks
Toledo Rockets football players
Cincinnati Bengals players
Tennessee Titans players
Atlanta Falcons players
San Antonio Commanders players